Charles Venable may refer to:

 Charles L. Venable (born 1960), former CEO of the Indianapolis Museum of Art in Indianapolis, Indiana
 Charles S. Venable (1827–1900), mathematician, astronomer, and military officer